KrishnaKant (K K) Goswami (born 3 September 1973) is an Indian television and film actor who appears in popular Hindi, Gujarati, Marathi, Bengali, Bhojpuri films and serials.

In the onscreen career spinning over twenty seven year's, Goswami has received numerous awards including Star Pariwar Award, Zee Rishtey Awards and many more.

Career 
Goswami begin his career in Junior-G as supportive villain followed by a leading role in Vikraal Aur Gabraal as Gabroo/Gabraal. Goswami continued in playing the role of Gabroo in Star Plus's 2001 TV series Ssshhhh...Koi Hai. and this show has a seqal on public demand names as Ssshhhh...Phir Koi Hai . Later Goswami played the role of Khali Bali in the daliy Show Shaktiman. 

After a brief period of decline in the 2000s, Goswami Received greater stardom in 2005 by playing a major role in SAB TV's Gutur Gu, as Pappu Maharaj the Chief. Goswami has also played the role of Khali Bali in the show named as Sankat Mochan Mahabali Hanumaan on Sony TV.

Filmography

Films

Television

References

External links
 

Living people
Place of birth missing (living people)
Indian male television actors
1973 births